Hapsidophrys principis is a species of snake in the family Colubridae.  It was described by George Albert Boulenger in 1906. The species occurs on the island of Príncipe in São Tomé and Príncipe, in elevations between 100 and 300 meters above sea level.

References

Colubrids
Reptiles described in 1906
Endemic vertebrates of São Tomé and Príncipe
Fauna of Príncipe
Taxa named by George Albert Boulenger